John Vance Robichaux, III (born May 8, 1984) is an American comedy writer and television producer.  He was the co-writer of the film Fist Fight. He was a writer and producer for the NBC primetime series Brooklyn Nine-Nine. He is also involved in labor issues and was nominated for the Writers Guild of America, West Board of Directors in 2022

Personal life 
Robichaux studied engineering at Washington University in St. Louis, before ultimately becoming a screenwriter.

Filmography

Fist Fight 
Robichaux wrote the 2017 feature film Fist Fight with co-writers Max Greenfield and Evan Susser.

Wedding Crashers 2
Robichaux is writing the upcoming sequel to Wedding Crashers, Wedding Crashers 2, with writing partner Evan Susser.

Brooklyn Nine-Nine 

 7.06: "Trying"
 8.04: "Balancing"

References

External links 

 

1984 births
American television writers
American male television writers
American television producers
Living people
Washington University in St. Louis alumni
McKelvey School of Engineering alumni